Juradó Airport  is an airstrip serving Juradó, a Pacific coastal village and municipality in the Chocó Department of Colombia.

The airstrip parallels the shoreline just inland from the water.

See also

Transport in Colombia
List of airports in Colombia

References

External links
OpenStreetMap - Juradó
FallingRain - Juradó Airport

Airports in Colombia